Kris Rinne is a technology person and retired Senior VP of network technology at AT&T Labs. She was an inductee to the 2013 Wireless Hall of Fame and the 2014 Women in Technology International Hall of Fame. She has been described as a key person in wireless technologies for her AT&T work.

References 

Year of birth missing (living people)
Living people
AT&T people
American women computer scientists
American computer scientists
21st-century American women